The Lingbao West railway station is a railway station of Zhengxi Passenger Railway located in Lingbao City, Henan, China. The station was among the 8 new passenger stations and 1 passing stations commissioned for the Zhengzhou‒Xi’an Railway project. Construction for this project reportedly commenced on 25 September 2005. Trial operations reportedly started on 28 December 2009, and commencement of commercial operations on 6 February 2010.

The station building has received criticism for its appearance. It has been listed by Hong Kong-based English language news media publishing group Asia Times as an “undisputed eyesore“.

The station is serviced by the G-train on the Xuzhou–Lanzhou High-Speed Railway. Departing from Xuzhou to Lanzhou, it is preceded by the station of Sanmenxia South, and followed by the Huashan North station.

References

Railway stations in Henan
Railway stations opened in 2010